The UIL Credito Esattorie e Assicurazioni or UILCA is an Italian banks insurances and tax collectors workers' trade union affiliated to the Italian Labour Union (UIL).

History
UILCA was born in January 1998 from the merge of two trade unions affiliated to UIL: Unione Italiana Bancari (UIB)   and UIL Assicurazioni (UILASS). In April 2000 also the Federazione Italiana Lavoratori Esattoriali (FILE) joined the union.

Affiliations
It is a member of UNI Global Union.

General secretaries
 Elio Porino  from 1982 to 2008
 Massimo Masi from 2008

Members
Last data available referred to year 2011 and indicate 43.957 members geographically distributed as follows:24.862 north Italy, 10.067 center Italy and 9.028 southern Italy.
When a member retires became member of UIL Pensionati.

See also
UIL
List of trade unions in Italy

Notes

External links
 uilca.it

Trade unions in Italy
Trade unions established in 1998
1998 establishments in Italy